Hameed Pura is a region located in Lahore, Punjab, Pakistan. It has the post code 54000, and is founded in the area of NA-124 and UC-141.

Aziz Bhatti Zone